Dragoş Panaitescu-Rapan (born 3 September 1944) is a Romanian bobsledder. He competed at the 1972, 1976 and the 1980 Winter Olympics.

References

1944 births
Living people
Romanian male bobsledders
Olympic bobsledders of Romania
Bobsledders at the 1972 Winter Olympics
Bobsledders at the 1976 Winter Olympics
Bobsledders at the 1980 Winter Olympics
Sportspeople from Budapest